Frank Saborowski (born 14 March 1958) is a retired German football defender.

References

External links
 

1958 births
Living people
German footballers
Bundesliga players
MSV Duisburg players
Bayer 04 Leverkusen players
VfL Bochum players
Rot-Weiss Essen players
Germany B international footballers
Place of birth missing (living people)
Association football defenders